Ishibu Higher Secondary School is a community school under government of Nepal located at the point of ishibu vdc ward no. 4 in Terathum district of Nepal. It is established in 1960 A.D as a primary school and has since been upgraded, adding a high school and later higher secondary school. Since it is situated on the lap of the Himalayas, it automatically has a panoramic environment of nature where the atmosphere is favorable for students. In the past its educating system was a old system where there was everything lacking  for studies, and teachers were used to regard as god like and it was quite rigorous management of school therefore, students were forced to study with hard labour memorising by heart. Teaching was a lecture based method so that there was rare practical education. But now education systems have been changing along with changes of time. It now has a modern library and it is equipped with sufficient halls for seating of students. The current principal is Mr. Ram Prasad Timsina, who succeeded Mr. Mahesh Niraula. Other schools in Nepal have the same name, but are distinguishable through their different locations.

Teachers 
Permanent Teachers:
Ram Prasad Timsina (headmaster, lecturer)
Bhola Nath Timsina (lecturer for sociology)
Binod Kumar Dev (science teacher, lecturer for health)
Renuka Ghimire (English teacher and lecturer)

Temporary Teachers:
Mr. Prakash Phombu (lecturer for math)
Mr. Chandra Lawati (lecturer for Opt English subject)
Chandra kala Sedai (teacher for Nepali subject)

Management Committee 
School Management committee has a total responsibility of monitoring, controlling, and resolving the problems appeared into the school. Mr. Mahendra Kumar Phombo is the Chairman of School Management Committee and has been working effectively for the past few decades.

Faculties 
It could have brought just an education stream up to now and it's in process of bringing many other facilities like Management, Science, Humanity, and it is offering education by focussing the main subject to Health and Nepali.

References 

Schools in Nepal
1960 establishments in Nepal